Dol pri Borovnici (in older sources also Dole) is a settlement north of Borovnica in the Inner Carniola region of Slovenia. It extends from the right bank of the Ljubljanica River to the outskirts of Borovnica.

Name
The name of the settlement was changed from Dol to Dol pri Borovnici in 1953.

References

External links

Dol pri Borovnici on Geopedia

Populated places in the Municipality of Borovnica